Trinity Academy Bradford (formerly Queensbury School and then Queensbury Academy) is an 11–16 mixed, secondary school located in Queensbury (near Bradford) in West Yorkshire, England.

Previously a foundation school administered by City of Bradford Metropolitan District Council, in September 2016 Queensbury School converted to academy status and was renamed Queensbury Academy. It was then sponsored by the Feversham Education Trust. It adopted its present name after becoming part of The Trinity Multi Academy Trust in February 2021.

References

External links 
 

Secondary schools in the City of Bradford
Academies in the City of Bradford